Southern Uzbek, also known as Afghan Uzbek, is the southern variant of the Uzbek language and an official language of Afghanistan where it is based and has up to 6 million speakers. It uses the Perso-Arabic writing system in contrast to the language variant of Uzbekistan.

Southern Uzbek is intelligible with the Northern Uzbek spoken in Uzbekistan to a certain degree. However it has differences in grammar and also many more loan words from Afghan Persian (in which many Southern Uzbek speakers are proficient).

Southern Uzbek Alphabet 

Southern Uzbek is written using the Perso-Arabic writing system called Arab Yozuv ("Arab Script"). Although it contains the same 32 letters which are used in Persian, it pronounces many of them in a different way.

See also 
 Chagatai language

References

External links 
 Online Dictionary
 Word translator from Southern Uzbek to Farsi

Agglutinative languages
Turkic languages
Turkic languages of Afghanistan
Languages of Kazakhstan
Languages of Kyrgyzstan
Languages of Russia
Languages of Tajikistan
Languages of Turkmenistan
Languages of Uzbekistan
Languages of China
 
Articles citing Nationalencyklopedin